Elytrophorus spicatus  (common name spikegrass) is a small plant in the Poaceae family native to Africa, the Indian subcontinent, south-east Asia and Australia.

Description
Elytrophorus spicatus is a tufted, annual or perennial plant with bristly culms. The leaves are loosely sheathed, and the blades are rolled in bud. The glumes are shortly awned, about 2 to 3 mm long, and have translucent margins translucent which are sparingly fringed with hairs. The  awn and keel  are rough. The plant flowers in response to flooding or rain.

Distribution
It is native to Bangladesh, Benin, Botswana, Burkina, Cameroon, Chad, China, East Himalaya, Eritrea, Ethiopia, Ghana, Guinea-Bissau, Hainan, India, Ivory Coast, Lesser Sunda Is., Mali, Mauritania, Myanmar, Namibia, Nepal, Australia, Niger, Nigeria, Senegal, South Australia, Sri Lanka, Sudan, Tanzania, Thailand, Togo, Vietnam, Himalaya, Zambia, and Zimbabwe.

Habitat
It is found in  damp soil along creeks, in damp hollows, in seepages, and in and near water.

Taxonomy
It was first described as Dactylis spicata by Carl Ludwig Willdenow in 1801. It was assigned to the genus, Elytrophorus, by Aimée Antoinette Camus in 1923.

References

External links
 Elytrophorus spicatus GBIF occurrence data

Molinieae
Flora of Australia
Plants described in 1801